A social game may refer to tabletop, other face-to-face indoor or outdoor games, or video games that allow or require social interaction between players as opposed to games played in solitude, games played at tournaments or competitions or games played for money.

Types of social games can include:

Tabletop games
Card games, that involve multiple players i.e. excluding patiences or solitaires
Board games, in which counters or pieces are placed, removed, or moved on a premarked surface according to a set of rules
Miniature wargaming, a form of wargaming that incorporates miniature figures, miniature armor and modeled terrain
Tabletop role-playing games, a game in which players assume the roles of characters in a fictional setting
Other face-to-face social games
Game of chance, a game whose outcome is strongly influenced by some randomizing device
Game of dares (or a dare game) is a game in which people dare each other to perform actions that they would not normally do.
Parlour games, indoor games such as charades
Live action role-playing games, a form of role-playing game where the participants physically act out their characters' actions
Alternate reality games, an interactive narrative using the real world as a platform
Video games
Social network games, games that have social network integration or elements
Mobile games, which can include social network games, which played on mobile devices
Multiplayer video games, where more than one person can play in the same game environment at the same time
LAN parties, a temporary gathering of people establishing a local area network (LAN), primarily for the purpose of playing multiplayer computer games
Massively multiplayer online games, video games where a large number of players can exist on the same server simultaneously
Online gambling (or Internet gambling) is any kind of gambling conducted on the internet.

References 

Lists of games